Hazakim, (pronounced ha-zah-keem), is a Christian hip hop duo originally from Columbus, Ohio. The group consists of brothers Michael "Mike" Wray and Anthony "Tony" Wray. Lamp Mode Recordings released the duo's second album Son of Man on September 23, 2014.  Son of Man broke into two Billboard charts. The first professional release from the duo in 2009 was Theophanies.  Hazakim is known for hip hop music that is uniquely Messianic; even rapping and singing in Hebrew, at times, over beats with traditional Mizrahi rhythms.

Early life
Michael "Mike" Wray, the eldest born, and Anthony "Tony" Wray, the youngest born  were brought up in the messianic Jewish movement by their parents.  They come from a multi-ethnic family consisting of Portuguese, Jewish, Jamaican, Italian, and Amazigh ancestry.

Music career
Hazakim started making music in 1997. Their first release in 1999 was an independent self-titled EP  with three songs, most notably "Liar, Lunatic, Lord, Or Legend" which is the only song from the EP on streaming services.

In 2001 they released their first full-length album, also an independent effort aptly titled  Hip-Hologetics due to its fusion of rap music and biblical apologetics.  They became signed to Lamp Mode Recordings prior to their 2009 release, Theophanies. Their sophomore release under Lamp Mode entitled Son of Man was released on September 23, 2014; the eve of Rosh Hashanah in light of the album's eschatological focus. This exposure helped the duo crack the Billboard charts, twice.

In January 2016 the brothers released a music video for a single entitled "Don't Forget the Ayin" which was shot on location in Tel Aviv and Jerusalem Israel.  According to the duo, the song was created to help "remove the stigma" surrounding Yeshua among Israelis, in what they call "the Jewish reclamation of Jesus."  

In December 2018 it was announced that Hazakim was set to release another album titled Origins, though no release date had been given.  On February 1, 2019, they released Origins on Wrath and Grace Records, a burgeoning Christian hip-hop label.  Reviews of the album were overwhelmingly positive; with some stating that Origins is the duo's best release to date, while others have compared its impact to their earlier Theophanies.  The focus of Origins is to provide an argument or defense of biblical creationism and intelligent design.  Origins includes production from Hazakim, as well as contributions from composer John Campbell, as well as hip-hop producers SPEC, Sean Rocktight Jones (Walter Rocktight) and Devin Morrison.

In addition to vocals, Mike and Tony do the majority of their own production.  The brothers now reside in Broward County, Florida where they are both married with children.

Members
Michael Wray 
Anthony (Tony) Wray

Discography

Studio albums

References

External links
 Official website

Musical groups established in 1997
Christian hip hop groups
Southern hip hop groups
Musical groups from Florida
American musical duos
Hip hop duos
American hip hop groups